The S6 is a railway service of the St. Gallen S-Bahn that provides hourly service between  and , in the cantons of St. Gallen and Glarus. Südostbahn, a private company primarily owned by the federal government and the canton of St. Gallen, operates the service.

Operations 
Between Rapperswil and  the S6 combines with the Voralpen-Express for half-hourly service. Between Ziegelbrücke and Schwanden, the S6 and the S25 of the Zürich S-Bahn combine for half-hourly service. Most S6 trains terminate in Schwanden, but the service continues to Linthal during off-peak hours (this leg is otherwise serviced by the S25).

Route 

  –  –  –  –  ( – , only during off-peak hours)

 Rapperswil
 
 
 Uznach
 
 
 Ziegelbrücke
 
 
 
 Glarus
 
 
 Schwanden
 
 
 
 
 
 
 Linthal

History 
The December 2013 timetable change applied the S6 designation to an existing hourly service between Rapperswil and Linthal. That service, and the new service, were operated by Swiss Federal Railways (SBB). Supplementing the S6 was the Glarner Sprinter, a long-distance train that originated at Zürich Hauptbahnhof and operated every two hours, terminating in Schwanden.

In July 2014, the Glarner Sprinter was designated the S25 of the Zürich S-Bahn, made hourly, and extended to Linthal. The S6, in turn, was cut back to Schwanden. SBB transferred the operation of the S6 to Südostbahn with the December 2020 timetable change.

References 

St. Gallen S-Bahn lines
Transport in the canton of Glarus
Transport in the canton of St. Gallen